Bellefontaine Municipal Airport (FAA LID: 7I7) was a general aviation airport north of Bellefontaine, OH. It opened about 1967 and was replaced by Bellefontaine Regional Airport in 2002.

References

Defunct airports in Ohio
Transportation in Logan County, Ohio
1967 establishments in Ohio
2002 disestablishments in Ohio